Clubiona kulczynskii is a species of sac spider in the family Clubionidae. It is found in North America, Europe, a range from Russia to Kazakhstan, and Japan.

References

Clubionidae
Articles created by Qbugbot
Spiders described in 1905